Hurricane hunters, typhoon hunters, or cyclone hunters are aircrews that fly into tropical cyclones to gather weather data. In the United States, the organizations that fly these missions are the United States Air Force Reserve's 53rd Weather Reconnaissance Squadron and the National Oceanic and Atmospheric Administration's Hurricane Hunters. Such missions have also been flown by Navy units and other Air Force and NOAA units. Other organizations also fly these missions, such as Government Flying Service Hong Kong.

The first crewed flight into a hurricane happened in 1943 when a pilot-trainer flew into a Category 1 hurricane near Galveston, Texas on a bet.

In the past, before satellites were used to find tropical storms, military aircraft flew routine weather reconnaissance tracks to detect formation of tropical cyclones. While modern satellites have improved the ability of meteorologists to detect cyclones before they form, only aircraft are able to measure the interior barometric pressure of a hurricane and provide accurate wind speed data, information needed to accurately predict hurricane development and movement.

Units

USAFR 53rd WRS

The Air Force Reserve 53rd Weather Reconnaissance Squadron, the world's only operational military weather reconnaissance unit, is based at Keesler Air Force Base in Biloxi, Mississippi; most weather recon flights originate there. The term "hurricane hunters" was first applied to its missions in 1946.

The USAFR hurricane hunters fly weather missions in an area midway through the Atlantic Ocean to the Hawaiian Islands, and have on occasion flown into  typhoons in the Pacific Ocean and gathered data in winter storms.

NOAA Hurricane Hunters

The civilian and NOAA Corps crew members of the NOAA Hurricane Hunters, originally based at the Aircraft Operations Center at MacDill AFB, in Tampa, Florida, mainly perform surveillance, research, and reconnaissance with highly instrumented aircraft including airborne Doppler weather radar measurements in both Atlantic and Pacific storms. In June 2017 the Hunters moved into a new facility at Lakeland Linder International Airport in Lakeland, Florida, after being at MacDill since 1993. They fly two Lockheed WP-3D Orion aircraft, heavily instrumented flying laboratories modified to take atmospheric and radar measurements within tropical cyclones and winter storms, and a G-IV Gulfstream high-altitude jet above  to document upper- and lower-level winds that affect cyclone movement. The computer models that forecast hurricane tracks and intensity mainly use G-IV dropsonde data collected day and night in storms affecting the United States.

Government Flying Service Hong Kong
Since 2009 the Government Flying Service of Hong Kong (GFS) have conducted regular flight data collection in cooperation with the Hong Kong Observatory. In 2011, the cooperation between GFS and the Observatory extended to reconnaissance flights to capture weather data for tropical cyclones over the South China Sea. In September 2016 they introduced the dropsonde system, which collects extra meteorological data on tropical cyclones to enhance the monitoring of typhoons.

History

Among the types of aircraft that have been used to investigate hurricanes, are an instrumented Lockheed U-2 flown in Hurricane Ginny during the 1963 Atlantic hurricane season. Other types include the A-20 Havoc, 1944; B-24, 1944–1945; B-17, 1945–1947; B-25, 1946–1947; B-29, 1946–1947. WB-29, 1951–1956; WB-50, 1956–1963; WB-47, 1963–1969; WC-121N 1954–1973; WC-130A, B, E, H, 1965–2012.

The idea of aircraft reconnaissance of hurricane storm trackers was put forth by Captain W. L. Farnsworth of the Galveston Commercial Association in the early 1930s.  Supported by the United States Weather Bureau, the "storm patrol bill" passed both the United States Senate and United States House of Representatives on June 15, 1936.

1943 Surprise Hurricane
The 1943 Surprise Hurricane, which struck Houston, Texas, during World War II, marked the first intentional meteorological flight into a hurricane. It started with a bet.

That summer, British pilots were being trained in instrument flying at Bryan Field. When they saw that the Americans were evacuating their AT-6 Texan trainers in the face of the storm, they began questioning the construction of the aircraft. Lead instructor Colonel Joe Duckworth took one of the trainers out and flew it straight into the eye of the storm. After he returned safely with navigator Lt. Ralph O'Hair, the base's weather officer, Lt. William Jones-Burdick, took over the navigator's seat and Duckworth flew into the storm a second time.

This flight showed that hurricane reconnaissance flights were possible, and further flights continued occasionally. In 1946, the moniker "Hurricane Hunters" was first used, and the Air Force and now Air Force Reserve have used it ever since.

VW-4
 
The United States Navy's VW-4 / WEARECORON FOUR Weather Reconnaissance Squadron Four, "Hurricane Hunters" was the seventh U.S. Navy squadron dedicated to weather reconnaissance. They flew several types of aircraft, but the WC-121N "Willy Victor" was the aircraft most often associated with flying into the "eye of the storm." The squadron operated WC-121s between late 1954 and 1972. VW-4 lost one aircraft and crew in a penetration of Hurricane Janet, and another to severe damage in a storm, but the severely damaged Willy Victor (MH-1) brought her crew home, although she never flew again. During 1973–1975, VW-4 operated the turbine-propeller Lockheed WP-3A Orion.

Hurricane Katrina
The landfall of Hurricane Katrina on 29 August 2005 devastated Keesler Air Force Base, home of the 53rd WRS. The equipment and personnel of the squadron were flying out of Dobbins Air Reserve Base near Atlanta. Despite heavy equipment losses, the squadron never missed a mission from the National Hurricane Center. The 53rd has since returned to Keesler.

Aircraft losses
 October 1, 1945 - A United States Navy Consolidated PB4Y-2 Privateer (Bureau Number: 59415) of VPB-119 went down in a Category 1 typhoon over the South China Sea. Six of the seven crew members were killed.
 October 26, 1952 - A United States Air Force Boeing WB-29 Superfortress (Serial Number: 44-69970) from the 54th Weather Reconnaissance Squadron was lost in Super Typhoon Wilma over the Pacific with 10 men aboard.
 December 16, 1953 - A United States Navy Consolidated PB4Y-2 Privateer (Bureau Number: 59716) of Airborne Early Warning Squadron (VW-3) was lost during reconnaissance of Super Typhoon Doris.  All nine members of the crew were killed.
 September 26, 1955 - A United States Navy Lockheed P2V Neptune of Airborne Early Warning Squadron Four (VW-4) disappeared in Hurricane Janet over the Caribbean Sea with nine Navy men and two Canadian journalists aboard.
 January 15, 1958 - A United States Air Force Boeing WB-50 Superfortress (Serial Number: 49-295) from the 54th Weather Reconnaissance Squadron went down southeast of Guam while flying into Super Typhoon Ophelia with nine men aboard.
 October 12, 1974 - In 1974, a newly converted Lockheed WC-130 Hercules (Serial Number: 65-0965) was transferred to the 54th Weather Reconnaissance Squadron, the "Typhoon Chasers", at Andersen Air Force Base on Guam. The aircraft was sent to investigate Typhoon Bess. The crew departed Clark Air Base in the Philippines with the callsign "Swan 38".  Radio contact with the aircraft was lost on 12 October 1974, apparently as the aircraft was heading into the typhoon's eye to make a second position fix. There were no radio transmissions indicating an emergency on board, and search teams could not locate the aircraft or its crew. All six crew members were listed as killed in action.  Swan 38 was the only WC-130 lost in a storm.

In popular culture
A reality television series featuring the USAFR 53rd WRS, entitled Hurricane Hunters, debuted on The Weather Channel in July 2012.

The story of a NOAA flight during Hurricane Hugo was shown as part of the Mayday television show on the during 2015.

See also

 Storm chasing

References
Notes

Bibliography
 Marson, Peter J., The Lockheed Constellation Series, 1982, Air-Britain (Historians) Ltd, Tonbridge, Kent, .

External links
 NOAA Hurricane Hunters
 Hunting Hurricane Hugo Flight of NOAA42
 Navy Hurricane Hunters homepage
 53rd Weather Reconnaissance Squadron homepage
  403rd Wing Homepage
 Air Weather Reconnaissance Association homepage
 ASN Accident description 13 OCT 1974 Lockheed WC-130H Hercules 65-0965
 NHC Reconnaissance data archive 
 The NOAA Aircraft Operations Center homepage
 VW-1 All Hands Alumni Association homepage
 Why and how people fly into hurricanes – USA Today – sidebar, "Fatal flights"

Tropical cyclone meteorology
United States special-purpose aircraft